The South Australia Proof of age card is an identity photo card available to residents of South Australia over the age of 18. It is available to drivers and non-drivers primarily as an identity document and to access places restricted to persons over the age of 18.

A key convenience of the card is that it can be obtained through an online application if the applicant has a drivers licence.

You can apply for your proof of age card at 17 years and 11 months old.

References

Identity documents of Australia
Society in South Australia
Age and society